Smârdan is a commune in Tulcea County, Northern Dobruja, Romania. It is composed of a single village, Smârdan. It is situated on the right bank of the Danube, opposite the city of Brăila.

References

Communes in Tulcea County
Localities in Northern Dobruja